Garamduz Rural District was in Khoda Afarin District of Kaleybar County, East Azerbaijan province, Iran. At the National Census of 2006, its population was 11,434 in 2,360 households. The largest of its 39 villages was Mahmudabad, with 1,058 people. When Khoda Afarin District was raised to the status of a county as Khoda Afarin County, the rural district became Garamduz District and was divided into two rural districts.

References 

Kaleybar County

Rural Districts of East Azerbaijan Province

Populated places in East Azerbaijan Province

Populated places in Kaleybar County

fa:بخش گرمادوز